Two Prudential Plaza is a 64-story skyscraper located in the Loop area of Chicago, Illinois.
-tallest building in Chicago  and the 28th-tallest in the U.S., being only five feet from 1,000 feet, making it the closest of any building under 1,000. Built in 1990, the building was designed by the firm Loebl Schlossman & Hackl, with Stephen T. Wright as the principal in charge of design. It has received 8 awards, including winning the Best Structure Award from the Structural Engineers Association of Illinois in 1995.

History
Construction started in 1988, and Two Prudential Plaza was completed in 1990. At the time of completion, Two Prudential was the world's tallest reinforced concrete building. Its distinctive shape features stacked chevron setbacks on the north and south sides, a pyramidal peak rotated 45°, and an  spire.

The building is attached to One Prudential Plaza (formerly known as the Prudential Building) since 1992. Without its spire, the building's height is still slightly greater than that of One Prudential Plaza's pinnacle.

In May 2006, BentleyForbes, a Los Angeles-based real estate investment firm run by Frederick Wehba and his family, purchased Two Prudential Plaza, along with its sister property, One Prudential Plaza for $470 million.

In 2015, BentleyForbes defaulted on the mortgage for the towers due to the Great Recession  and New York-based investors 601W Companies and Berkley Properties took control of the property after investing more than $100 million in equity to recapitalize.   BentleyForbes continues to have an interest in the owning partnership.

Tenants
The Consulate General of Canada in Chicago is located in Suite 2400. The Flag of Canada is flown next to that of the United States in the building's Lake Street plaza.

Audacy occupies the ninth to twelfth floors, including WBBM, WBBM-FM, WBMX, WXRT, WUSN, WSCR and WCFS.

The building has been home of the Chicago Tribune and Tribune Publishing since leaving Tribune Tower in July 2018.

In popular culture 
The building and the plaza appear in the 1994 film Richie Rich as Rich Industries Inc.

Position in Chicago's skyline

Gallery

See also
List of buildings and structures
List of tallest buildings
List of tallest buildings in Chicago
List of tallest buildings in the United States
List of tallest buildings and structures

References

External links

Official website
 Two Prudential Plaza on CTBUH Skyscraper Center
Emporis entry for Two Prudential Plaza

Buildings and structures completed in 1990
Chicago Tribune
1990 establishments in Illinois
Skyscraper office buildings in Chicago
Newspaper headquarters in the United States
Newspaper buildings
Prudential Financial buildings
Postmodern architecture in the United States